Matti Huhta (born 1976 in Espoo, Finland) better known by his stage name Seremoniamestari is a Finnish rap artist and poet. Seremoniamestari is Finnish for Master of Ceremonies. In 2003, he shortened his artist name to simply Sere.

He was the first artist to release a Finnish-only rap EP (Edustaa edustaa in 1998) and the first to release a Finnish-only album Omin sanoin in 2000.

At the beginning of his career, Sere became widely known as one of the first Finnish rappers to use multisyllabic rhymes and influenced many Finnish rappers to evolve their rhyming to more complex styles.

Discography

Albums

Demos / EPs
1998: Edustaa edustaa 
1999: Maan alla
1999: Potkin uutta tiedettä

Singles

References 

Finnish rappers
Living people
1976 births